Odor or Ódor or O'Dor, is a surname. 

Notable people with the surname include:

 Andrea Ódor (born 1975), Hungarian baseball player
 Ferenc Ódor (born 1954), Hungarian veterinary physician and politician
 Gabriel Odor (born 2000), Austrian speed skater
 Kieth O'dor or Odor (1962–1995), British racing driver
 Lajos Ódor (born 1960), Hungarian rower
 George Odor (born 2001), D3 collegiate swimmer & volleyball player
 Rouglas Odor (born 1968), Venezuelan baseball player
 Rougned Odor (born 1994), Venezuelan Major League Baseball player
 Steven O'Dor (born 1987), Australian footballer

See also

 
 Ozor